The John Brophy Award goes to the ECHL coach adjudged to have contributed the most to his team's success as voted by the coaches of each of the ECHL teams. The John Brophy Award has been awarded since 1989. The award is named after John Brophy, who coached in the league for 13 seasons and won 575 regular and postseason games, an ECHL record. The award, founded in 1989 and originally named Coach Of The Year, was renamed in his honor in 2003.

Bob Ferguson is the only multiple winner of the award having won it in 1999 and 2000.

Awardees

See also 
 ECHL awards

References

External links 
Official website
Intotheboards.net Playoffs

Awards established in 1989
ECHL trophies and awards